SJN may refer to:

 Shortest job next, a scheduling policy
 ISO 639-3 code for Sindarin, a fictional language devised by J. R. R. Tolkien